Events from the year 1511 in Ireland.

Incumbent
Lord: Henry VIII

Deaths
 Walter Fitzsimon, Archbishop of Dublin.

References